The St. Petersburg Pelicans were one of the eight original franchises that began playing in the Senior Professional Baseball Association in 1989. The team was managed by Bobby Tolan, while Dick Bosman, Ozzie Virgil, Sr. and Tom Zimmer served as coaches. They played their home games at Al Lang Stadium in Downtown St. Petersburg, Florida.

The Pelicans went 42-30 in the regular season and won the Northern Division title.  Steve Henderson hit .352 for the club, and Lenny Randle batted .349.  Milt Wilcox went 12-3, and Jon Matlack added 10 wins.  Led by Lamar Johnson's home run and three RBI, the Pelicans went on to beat the West Palm Beach Tropics 12-4 to win the league's championship game.

The team returned for a second season but ceased operation when the league folded in December 1990.

Notable players

 Alan Bannister
 Len Barker
 Butch Benton
 Todd Cruz
 Iván de Jesús
 Taylor Duncan
 Dock Ellis
 Sergio Ferrer
 George Foster
 Luis Gómez
 Glenn Gulliver
 Al Holland
 Steve Henderson 
 Roy Howell
 Lamar Johnson 
 Steve Kemp
 Pete LaCock
 Ken Landreaux 
 Tito Landrum
 Bill Lee
 Ron LeFlore
 Randy Lerch
 Dwight Lowry
 Jerry Martin
 Jon Matlack
 Bake McBride 
 Joe Pittman
 Dave Rajsich
 Gary Rajsich
 Lenny Randle
 Jerry Reed 
 Jim Rice
 Dave Rozema
 Joe Sambito
 Elías Sosa
 Sammy Stewart
 Ozzie Virgil, Jr.
 Chris Welsh
 Milt Wilcox 
 Mike Williams
 Pat Zachry

Source:

Notes
The original St. Petersburg Pelicans were a team that played in the 1940s and 1950s in the Florida State Negro Baseball League
. They played its home games at Campbell Park in St. Petersburg.

On June 21, 2008 the Tampa Bay Rays wore St. Petersburg Pelicans jerseys to honor the team in a game against the Houston Astros.

Sources

Defunct baseball teams in Florida
Senior Professional Baseball Association teams
Sports in St. Petersburg, Florida
1989 establishments in Florida
1990 disestablishments in Florida
Baseball teams established in 1989
Baseball teams disestablished in 1990